Mutnedjmet, also spelled Mutnedjemet, Mutnodjmet, Mutnodjemet was an ancient Egyptian queen, the Great Royal Wife of Horemheb, the last ruler of the 18th Dynasty. The name, Mutnedjmet, translates as: The sweet Mut.

Titles
Mutnedjemet's titles include: Hereditary Princess (iryt-p`t), Great King’s Wife (hmt-niswt-wrt), Great of Praises (wrt-hzwt), Lady of  Grace (nbt-im3t), Sweet of Love (bnrt-mrwt), Mistress of Upper and Lower Egypt (hnwt-Shm’w -mhw), Songstress of Hathor (hsyt-nt-hwt-hrw), and Songstress of Amun (Sm’yt-nt-imnw)

Mutnedjmet as Nefertiti's sister
Some Egyptologists have speculated that Mutnedjemet is identical to Nefertiti's sister Mutbenret. This identification was partially based on the fact that Mutbenret's name used to be read as Mutnedjmet. Other Egyptologist such as Geoffrey Martin note that there is no definite evidence to prove this assertion. Martin writes that:
 The name Mutnodjmet was not particularly rare in the late Eighteenth Dynasty, and even if she were the sister of Nefertiti her marriage to Horemheb would have had no effect on Horemheb's legitimacy or candidacy since Mutnodjmet (who is depicted in the private tombs at El-Amarna) was not herself of royal blood. In any case whatever her antecedents Mutnodjmet could have been married to Horemheb a little before he became Pharaoh.

Monuments and inscriptions
Mutnedjmet is known from several objects and inscriptions:
 A double statue of Horemheb and Mutnedjmet was found in Karnak, but is now in the Museo Egizio in Turin (1379). On Mutnedjmet's side of the throne she is depicted as a winged sphinx who adores her own cartouche. As a sphinx she is depicted wearing a flat topped crown topped with plant elements associated with the goddess Tefnut. The back of the statue records Horemheb's rise to power.
 Horemheb and Mutnodjemet are depicted in the tomb of Roy (TT255) in Dra Abu el-Naga. The royal couple are shown in an offering scene.
 One of the colossal statues in Karnak (north side of the 10th pylon) was made for Horemheb and depicted Mutnedjmet. The statue was later usurped and reinscribed for Ramesses II and Nefertari.
 Mutnedjmet usurped several inscriptions of Ankhesenamun in Luxor.
 Statues (fragments) and other items including alabaster fragments naming Mutnodjemet were found in Horemheb's Saqqara tomb. Some items bear funerary texts.

Death and burial
Mutnedjmet died soon after Year 13 of her husband's rule in her mid-40s based on a wine-jar docket found in a burial chamber of Horemheb tomb at Saqqara, in Memphis and a statue and other items of hers found here. The mummy was found in King Horemheb's unused Memphite tomb along with the mummy of a still-born, premature infant. She appears to have been buried in the Memphite tomb of Horemheb, alongside his first wife Amenia. Mutnedjmet's mummy shows she had given birth several times, but the last King of the 18th Dynasty did not have a living heir at the time of his death. It has been suggested that she had a daughter who was simply not mentioned on any monuments. The presence of the infant along with Mutnedjmet in the tomb suggests that this queen died in childbirth. A canopic jar of the Queen is now located in the British Museum.

It is possible that the tomb QV33 in the Valley of the Queens was originally built for her. The tomb is known as the tomb of an otherwise unknown Tanedjmet, but both cartouches with her name are damaged and the similar hieroglyphs for ta and mut allow for this interpretation.

In popular culture
 The South African artist Winifred Brunton painted a portrait of this queen during the 1920s.
 In Michelle Moran's novel, Nefertiti: A Novel, Mutnedjmet is the principal character as the younger sister of Queen Nefertiti. She is also referenced in Moran's second novel, The Heretic Queen, as the mother of the principal character, Princess and later Queen Nefertari.
 Mutnedjmet is one of two main characters in Kerry Greenwood's historical mystery, Out of the Black Land (2010)

References

14th-century BC Egyptian women
Princesses of the Eighteenth Dynasty of Egypt
Deaths in childbirth
Queens consort of the Eighteenth Dynasty of Egypt
1300s BC deaths
Year of birth unknown
Ancient Egyptian mummies
Horemheb
Ay